That's Tough is an American documentary television series on G4. It was based on a concept by executive producers Adam Cohen, Cara Tapper, and Joanna Vernetti. There were no hosts attached to the show and it was produced by Super Delicious Productions. Filming was based in Santa Monica, California and eight episodes have been ordered for the first season. The series premiered on October 20, 2010 with all new episodes that aired every Wednesday at 8:30 pm until the season finale on December 8, 2010.

Background
That's Tough opens up with: "You want tough? We're counting down the toughest..." The show reveals the toughest high-security prisons, sniper units, little people, and bank vaults. Other examples are: the toughest dictators, armored state cars, fighting styles, street gangs, special forces, and insects. G4TV has ordered eight half-hour episodes of the series, which premiered on Oct. 20, 2010. Each episode will profile the three toughest entries in each category and countdown the top 5 or 3 of each.

Tagline: Dude Manrod (Kevin Pereira) says:

Style
The toughest people, places or things in the world are identified utilizing footage and live-action recreations of some of the topics. An omniscient narration provides background information within each topic. Plus, expert testimony from various backgrounds is also offered up during some of the topics.

Specialists
Jake Amar – Environmental engineer (toughest cleaning crews)
Mike Burton – CEO, International Armoring Corporation (toughest armored cars)
Thomas Carter – Corrections officer (toughest prison breaks)
Joseph Childs – Little person stuntman (toughest little dudes)
Lee Cohen – Former U.S. Navy commander, retired (toughest military sea vehicles)
Timothy Crehan – Theologian (toughest monks)
Anthony Davis – Security director (toughest bodyguards)
John "Jack" Garafalo – Retired narcotics agent (toughest crime organizations)
Kevin Hand – Vault door designer/vault expert (toughest mega vaults)
Chris Hays – Professional sniper (toughest sniper units)
Jimmy "Hillbilly" Herald – Hugh rock music fan and rock historian (toughest rock stars)
Eric Hess – Travel writer (toughest roads)
James Hogue – Entomologist (toughest insects)
Scott Jurek – Marathon champ (toughest foot races)
Lew Knopp – Former U.S. Navy SEAL (toughest military courses)
Richard Lichten – Retired jail watch commander (toughest prisons)
Dr. Michael Siler – Professor of international relations (toughest modern dictators)
Chris Stanko – Knife maker (Toughest blades)

Episode guide

Season 1 (2010)

References

External links
 www.g4tv.com/tough

G4 (American TV network) original programming
2010s American documentary television series
2010 American television series debuts
2010 American television series endings